Jhurkiya is a village development committee in Morang District in the Kosi Zone of south-eastern Nepal. At the time of the 1991 Nepal census it had a population of 8452 people living in 1974 individual households.

Gallery

References

Village development committees in Morang District
Ratuwamai Municipality